The 1931 Troy State Red Wave football team represented Troy State Teachers College (now known as Troy University) as an independent during the 1931 college football season. Led by first-year head coach Albert Elmore, the Red Wave compiled an overall record of 6–3.

Schedule

References

Troy State
Troy Trojans football seasons
Troy State Red Wave football